Ben White (born 27 October 1994) is an English professional rugby league footballer who plays as a scrum-half or stand-off for the Batley Bulldogs in the Betfred Championship.

He previously played for the Leeds Rhinos in the Super League, and on loan from Leeds at the Gloucestershire All Golds in League 1. White also played for the Swinton Lions in Championship 1 and the Championship, and Halifax and the Barrow Raiders in the Championship.

Background
White was born in Hounslow, London, England

Playing career
White is an England Youth international. He was in the Leeds Rhinos Academy system and played his junior rugby league with the Saddleworth Rangers club.

In August 2014 White made his Super League début for Leeds in the defeat by the London Broncos. He has previously played on loan from the Rhinos at the Gloucestershire All Golds in 2014.

In 2015 he joined the Swinton Lions on a full-time deal. In 2015 he was nominated for the Kingstone Press League 1 Young Player of the Year.

References

External links
 Swinton Lions profile

1994 births
Living people
Barrow Raiders players
Batley Bulldogs players
English rugby league players
Germany national rugby league team players
Gloucestershire All Golds players
Halifax R.L.F.C. players
Leeds Rhinos players
People from the London Borough of Hounslow
Rugby league five-eighths
Rugby league halfbacks
Rugby league players from Greater London
Swinton Lions players